Reichelsheim Airport is a general aviation airport located in German state of Hesse, just 30 minutes north of Frankfurt am Main.

Facilities
It has an asphalt paved runway designated 18/36 which measures .
It offers runway - and taxiway illumination, PAPI, REIL and ALS.
Aircraft up to 8,000 kg (17,636 lb) are allowed to land at the airport.

The aerodrome also serves as an important heliport for medevac and VIP transports. Johanniter-Unfall-Hilfe e. V. is present with its 24h/365days medevac helicopters Christoph Hessen and Christoph Rhein-Main.

Airlines and destinations
There are no scheduled services to and from Reichelsheim Airport.

External links
 Official website

Airports in Hesse